Imaginaerum World Tour was the fifth world tour by Finnish symphonic metal band Nightwish, in support of their seventh studio album, Imaginaerum.

The tour started in Los Angeles, USA, on January 21, 2012, and then the band played an arena tour in Europe between March and May, and the group has also performed in North and Latin America later that year. In 2013, the band performed in Asia and Oceania, finishing the tour with festival shows in Europe, in a 104 concert tour that finished on August 11, 2013.

A "secret" concert under the pseudonym "Rubber Band of Wolves" was held at the Key Club in Hollywood, California, on January 19, 2012.

On September 28 in Denver, Colorado, Anette was rushed to the hospital and missed the show that night. Kamelot backup vocalists Elize Ryd and Alissa White-Gluz stepped in and performed five songs. Anette did her final show on the September 29th show in Salt Lake City, before parting ways with the band on October 1. Floor Jansen replaced Olzon on the remainder of the tour.

Setlist

Sample Setlist
The following setlist was performed at a concert during the 70000 Tons of Metal festival, but has since had alterations to it:
 "Finlandia" (intro)
 "Storytime"
 "Wish I Had an Angel"
 "Amaranth" (with long outro)
 "Scaretale"
 "The Siren" (with "Arabesque" and "Tutankhamen" samples)
 "Slow, Love Slow"
 "I Want My Tears Back" (featuring Troy Donockley)
 "The Crow, the Owl and the Dove" (featuring Troy Donockley)
 "The Islander" (acoustic version, featuring Troy Donockley)
 "Nemo" (acoustic version, with "Angels Fall First" samples and featuring Troy Donockley)
 "Last of the Wilds" (featuring Troy Donockley)
 "Planet Hell" (with "Stargazers", "Gethsemane" and "Wayfarer" samples. First performance live since 2005)
 "Song of Myself" ("Love" section omitted)
 "Last Ride of the Day"
Encore:
 "The Poet and the Pendulum"
 "Over the Hills and Far Away" (Gary Moore cover, featuring Troy Donockley. First performance live since 2005)
 "Imaginaerum" (outro)

Setlist Alterations/Notes

One of the band's performances during the 70000 Tons of Metal festival included the song "Dead to the World" and another performance included "Romanticide."

When the band kicked off the first leg of their tour in March, the setlist remained mostly unchanged, but with "Finlandia" moved to the beginning of the encore and "Taikatalvi" inserted to open the show. "The Siren" would occasionally be replaced with "Ever Dream" or "Dead to the World".

Starting with the concert held on March 4, "The Poet and the Pendulum" and "Over the Hills and Far Away" were moved up to close the show, and "Song of Myself" and "Last Ride of the Day" were moved down to serve as the encore.

The concert held on March 9, 2012, at the Paviljonki Areena in Jyväskylä, Finland included the world premiere of the song "Ghost River" following "Planet Hell". The following concert on March 10 included "Dead to the World" in place of "The Poet and the Penedulum". These songs have been used later on.

The concert held on March 17, 2012, in Ukraine included "Come Cover Me". The song was played between Scaretale and The Siren. The song was performed again on April 13, 2012 in the Netherlands, and remained part of the setlist until April 16. On these dates, "The Siren" was not played, and "Come Cover Me" was played between "I Want My Tears Back" and "The Crow, the Owl and the Dove" with Marco's voice on the chorus, new arrangements and Troy playing. This altered setlist was used again on April 21, remaining that way through May 3.

On 5 May 2012, "Dark Chest of Wonders" was played following "Ghost River", with "Dead to the World" played in place of "The Siren". "Dead to the World" was returned to its proper place in the set on 6 May, but "Ever Dream" was played in place of "The Siren".

Nightwish kicked off its North American Tour on September 12, 2012, with a few changes to the setlist. "Roll Tide" was played as the intro instead of "Taikatalvi", "Dead to the World" was played in place of "The Siren", and "Dark Chest of Wonders" was played in place of "Ghost River".

The second performance in Atlanta, USA, on September 13, 2012, of the beginning North-American Tour included "Higher Than Hope" played before "Over the Hills and Far Away", only played four times before with Anette Olzon. This show also included "The Siren" instead of "Dead to the World" and "Ghost River" instead of "Dark Chest of Wonders", and excluded "The Crow, the Owl and the Dove".

The concert held on 15 September 2012, in the Beacon Theatre, New York included "Escapist" played in place of "Planet Hell".

The concert held on 16 September 2012 featured "7 Days to the Wolves" played instead of "Planet Hell", with "Planet Hell" played instead of "Scaretale". This show was also the last to feature "The Siren" instead of "Dead to the World", which was played in place of "Higher Than Hope" for this performance.

From September 17, 2012 onward, the setlist reverted to its format at the start of the North American tour, but with "Ghost River" played in place of "Dark Chest of Wonders". "Dark Chest of Wonders" was played after "Ghost River" on September 21; "Dead to the World" was replaced with "7 Days to the Wolves" on the same date.

"7 Days to the Wolves" was played in place of "Scaretale" on September 23 and 24.

On September 24, 25 and 27, "The Crow, the Owl and the Dove" was omitted and "Dark Chest of Wonders" was played following "Ghost River". The concert held on September 27 also included "The Siren" played in place of "Dead to the World".

Olzon was hospitalized due to illness during the concert held on September 28, 2012 in Denver, Colorado, so Elize Ryd and Alissa White-Gluz of Kamelot filled in on vocals. The shortened setlist included the world premiere of "Rest Calm".

The concert held on September 29 omitted "Dead to the World" and included "Rest Calm" after "Ghost River".

Following the departure of Anette Olzon on October 1, 2012, Floor Jansen (ex-After Forever & ReVamp) agreed to continue touring with the group. The setlist featuring Jansen was largely unchanged from that featuring Olzon, but with "Dark Chest of Wonders" following "Wish I Had an Angel", "Slow, Love, Slow" and "Over the Hills and Far Away" omitted, and "Song of Myself" and "Last Ride of the Day" moved up to follow "Ghost River", meaning the band no longer performed an encore.

"Slow, Love, Slow" was reintroduced into the setlist on October 3, 2012 following "Dead to the World", with "The Crow, the Owl and the Dove" removed.

The concert held on October 6, 2012, included "Higher Than Hope" played following "Ghost River" and omitted "Dead to the World".

Beginning October 7, 2012, "Dead to the World" was replaced with "Ever Dream".

The concert held on 10 October 2012, at Emo's, in Austin, Texas, included "Ghost Love Score" played following "Song of Myself"; "Scaretale" was not played. This change in the setlist was used in later shows.

Beginning October 11, "Wish I Had an Angel" and "Dark Chest of Wonders" were switched in the set.

"The Siren" was played first time with Floor at Birmingham on 6 November 2012.

"Arabesque" was played first time at Hartwall Arena, Finland, and featured fire dancers. The first public screening of Imaginaerum took place after the concert.

"Wishmaster" was played first time with Floor at Mexico City on 29 November 2012.

"7 Days to the Wolves" was played first time with Floor at Adelaide on 18 January 2013.

Tour dates

 A This was a secret concert that the band played under the pseudonym "Rubber Band of Wolves".
 B This was the band's only show with guest vocalists Elize Ryd and Alissa White-Gluz of Kamelot filling in for Anette Olzon who was hospitalized due to illness
 C This was the band's last show with vocalist Anette Olzon, and Floor Jansen filled in on every show for the remainder of the tour.
 D The world premiere of Imaginaerum took place after the concert at Hartwall Areena.

Personnel
Nightwish
 Anette Olzon – lead vocals (until 29 September 2012)
 Tuomas Holopainen – keyboards
 Emppu Vuorinen – guitars
 Jukka Nevalainen – drums
 Marko Hietala – bass, male vocals

Additional musicians
 Troy Donockley – Uilleann pipes, tin whistle, additional vocals
 Elize Ryd* – female vocals
 Alissa White-Gluz* – female vocals
 Floor Jansen – lead vocals (from 1 October 2012 onwards)

* filled in as vocalist during the September 28, 2012 show in Denver, Colorado while Anette Olzon was hospitalized due to illness.

References

External links
Nightwish's Official Website

Nightwish concert tours
2012 concert tours

pt:Imaginaerum World Tour